This article is a comparison of the Baltic states.

Geography

Politics

Government

International organisation membership

Economy

Demographics

Telecommunication

See also

 Comparison of the Benelux countries
 Comparison of the Nordic countries

References

Baltic states